Fletcher House may refer to:

In New Zealand
Fletcher House (Otago Peninsula), Broad Bay, Otago Peninsula, listed on the NZHPT register as a category II historic place

In the United Kingdom
Fletcher House (Shrewsbury), a historic office complex in Shrewsbury, formerly a printing works

In the United States

Northeast/Atlantic seaboard
Terry Homestead, Bristol, CT, also known as Fletcher Terry House
Jonathan Fletcher House, Medford, Massachusetts, listed on the NRHP in Middlesex County, Massachusetts
Henry Fletcher House, Westford, MA, listed on the NRHP in Middlesex County, Massachusetts
Pagan-Fletcher House, Valley Stream, NY, listed on the NRHP in Nassau County, New York
Paris and Anna Fletcher House, Bridport, VT, listed on the NRHP in Addison County, Vermont
Fletcher-Fullerton Farm, Woodstock, VT, listed on the NRHP in Windsor County, Vermont

South
Fletcher House (Little Rock, Arkansas), listed on the NRHP in Pulaski County
Pike-Fletcher-Terry House, Little Rock, AR, listed on the NRHP in Pulaski County, Arkansas
W.P. Fletcher House, Lonoke, AR, listed on the NRHP in Lonoke County, Arkansas
John T. Fletcher House, Columbus, GA, listed on the NRHP in Muscogee County, Georgia
Kennesaw House in Marietta, Georgia, formerly the Fletcher House hotel during the American Civil War
Fletcher-Skinner-Nixon House and Outbuildings, Hertford, NC, listed on the NRHP in Perquimans County, North Carolina

Midwest
Ruffin Drew Fletcher House, Streator, IL, listed on the NRHP in LaSalle County, Illinois
Calvin I. Fletcher House, Indianapolis, IN, listed on the NRHP in Marion County, Indiana
Thomas C. Fletcher House, Hillsboro, MO, listed on the NRHP in Jefferson County, Missouri

West
P.W. Fletcher House, Tucson, Arizona, listed on the National Register of Historic Places (NRHP) in Pima County, Arizona
Fletcher-Stretch House, Dayton, OR, listed on the NRHP in Yamhill County, Oregon
Francis Fletcher House, Dayton, OR, listed on the NRHP in Yamhill County, Oregon
Alfred P. Fletcher Farmhouse, Lafayette, OR, listed on the NRHP in Yamhill County, Oregon